New Hampshire's 4th congressional district is an obsolete district. This short-lived district was organized in 1847.  It was eliminated after the 1850 Census. The last member serving the district was Harry Hibbard.

List of members representing the district

References

 Congressional Biographical Directory of the United States 1774–present

Former congressional districts of the United States
04